Sarah C. Paine (in publications, S. C. M. Paine) is a professor of strategy and policy at the U.S. Naval War College located in Newport, Rhode Island. She has written and co-edited several books on naval policy and related affairs, and subjects of interest to the United States Navy or Defense. Other works she has authored concern the political and military history of East Asia, particularly China, during the modern era.

Personal life 
Paine spent ten years acquiring her PhD in Russian and Chinese history at Columbia University, which included five years of research and language study in China, Taiwan, Russia, Japan, and Australia. She has received two Title VIII fellowships from the Hoover Institution, two Fulbright fellowships, and other fellowships from Japan, Taiwan, and Australia.

Sarah has two brothers – John B. Paine III, and Thomas M. Paine.

Academic background

She holds the following degrees: 
 Ph.D. Russian and Chinese history, Columbia University. 
M.I.A. Columbia University School for International and Public Affairs with certificates from both the Russian and East Asian institutes.
M.A. Russian Language, Middlebury College Russian School. 
B.A. Special concentration in Latin American Studies, Harvard University.

Year-long language programs completed at:
Stanford Center, Taipei, Taiwan.
Taipei Language Institute, Taipei, Taiwan.
International Christian University, Tokyo, Japan.

Selected publications

Author

The Japanese Empire: Grand Strategy from the Meiji Restoration to the Pacific War (Cambridge University Press, 2017).
The Wars for Asia 1911–1949 (Cambridge University Press, 2012). 2012 Winner of the PROSE award for European & World History and longlisted for the Lionel Gelber prize. 
The Sino-Japanese War of 1894–1895: Perceptions, Power, and Primacy (Cambridge University Press, 2003).
Imperial Rivals: China, Russia, and Their Disputed Frontier, 1858–1924 (M.E. Sharpe, 1996). Winner of the 1997 Barbara Jelavich Book Prize.

Co-author with Bruce A. Elleman:

Modern China: Continuity and Change, 1644 to the Present (Prentice Hall, 2010).

Editor

Nation Building, State Building and Economic Development: Case Studies and Comparisons (M.E. Sharpe, 2010).

Co-editor with Bruce A. Elleman:

Naval Power and Expeditionary Warfare: Peripheral Campaigns and New Theatres of Naval Warfare (Routledge, 2011).
Naval Coalition Warfare: From the Napoleonic War to Operation Iraqi Freedom (Routledge, 2008). 
Naval Blockades and Seapower: Strategies and Counter-Strategies 1805–2005 (Routledge, 2005).

Notes

Naval historians
American military historians
American women historians
Historians of China
Harvard University alumni
Middlebury College alumni
School of International and Public Affairs, Columbia University alumni
Women military writers
Living people
Year of birth missing (living people)
21st-century American women
Historians of Japan